Shiraz University of Arts is the fourth university of arts in Iran and the first in the southern part of the country.

Majors 
 Carpet
 Monument Restoration
 Museum Management
 Interior Architecture
 Archaeology
Theatrical Literature
Painting 
50 more majors are planned to be added in 10 years.

References

External links 
 Website of Shiraz University of Arts

Education in Shiraz
Universities in Iran
Buildings and structures in Shiraz